Echium wildpretii is a species of flowering plant in the family Boraginaceae. The species is endemic to the Canary Islands, and is found mainly on Mount Teide in Tenerife. The subspecies E. wildpretii subsp. trichosiphon occurs at high altitudes on the island of La Palma. The common names are tower of jewels, red bugloss, Tenerife bugloss or Mount Teide bugloss.

Etymology
The Latin specific epithet wildpretii honours the 19th century Swiss botanist Hermann Josef Wildpret.

Description
It is a  biennial, producing a dense rosette of leaves during the first year, flowers in the second year, and then dies. The red flowers are borne on an erect inflorescence, . The plant blooms from late spring to early summer in Tenerife.

Habitat
The plant grows in the subalpine zone of the ravines of Mount Teide, a volcano on Tenerife in the Canary Islands, Spain. As a sub-alpine endemic plant with a narrow climatic niche and small distribution, the species is likely to be negatively impacted by climate change.

Uses
This plant can be found as a garden ornamental but is intolerant of low temperatures, thus some winter protection is required in frost-prone areas. It has gained the Royal Horticultural Society's Award of Garden Merit. As with most buglosses, it is favoured by bee-keepers for its high nectar content.

References

External links

Encyclopedia of Life entry
GBIF entry

wildpretii
Endemic flora of the Canary Islands
Tenerife
Garden plants of Africa
Biennial plants
Drought-tolerant plants
Taxa named by Joseph Dalton Hooker